Jewell High School may refer to:

Jewell High School (Kansas)
Jewell School, Jewell, Oregon